Nogometni klub Zadar, commonly referred to as NK Zadar or simply Zadar, was a Croatian football club based in Zadar, a city on the Adriatic coast, best known for playing in the top flight of Croatian football for almost twenty years.

History
The first football club in Zadar was established in 1876 and was named AC Dalmazia. The club played mostly in Italian leagues until the city annexation to Yugoslavia in 1945.  On April 26, 1945, a new club named Fiskulturno društvo Zadar was founded, with departments of football, basketball and athletics. On February 9, 1949, the football department was spun off as NK Zadar.

Zadar played in the Yugoslav Second League on a number of occasions, most recently in 1986.

In 1992, as Zadarkomerc the club was a founding member of the Croatian First League. Since 2001, the club has officially been called NK Zadar.

The club's greatest success in the Croatian Football Cup was achieved in season 1995–96, when they lost in the semi-final against Croatia Zagreb.

NK Zadar played in the top tier from 1992 to 1999, from 2001 to 2005, and from 2007 to 2015. Most recently, the club has been experiencing financial difficulties, and after two seasons spent in the Croatian Third League – South (2016–17, 2017–18), the club was promoted to the Croatian Second League. After a mid-table finish in 2018–19, Zadar were administratively relegated to the Third League. As of June 2019, the club had hired an attorney to appeal against their relegation.

On 20 July 2020 it was announced that NK Zadar had dissolved because of bankruptcy. A new team, HNK Zadar, was announced as its formal successor.

Stadium
NK Zadar's home stadium is the Stanovi with a capacity of 3,858 persons.

Supporters
The club's supporters are known as the Tornado Zadar.

Honours
Prva B HNL:
Runners-up (1): 1995–96
Druga HNL:
Runners-up (1): 2006–07
Treća HNL - Jug:
Third place, promotion (1): 2017–18

Seasons

Key

Top scorer shown in bold when he was also top scorer for the division.

P = Played
W = Games won
D = Games drawn
L = Games lost
F = Goals for
A = Goals against
Pts = Points
Pos = Final position

1. HNL = Croatian First League
2. HNL = Croatian Second League

PR = Preliminary round
R1 = Round 1
R2 = Round 2
QF = Quarter-finals
SF = Semi-finals
RU = Runners-up
W  = Winners

Notable players
To appear in this section a player must have:
 Played at least 150 league games for the club;
 Scored at least 50 league goals for the club; or
 Played at least one international match for their national team while playing for NK Zadar.
Years in brackets indicate their spells at the club.

 Jakov Surać (1992–1998, 2001–2016)
 Fahrudin Šehić (1992–1999)
 Zvonimir Jurić (1994–2005)
 Dalibor Zebić (1996–1999, 2001–2005)
 Luka Modrić (1996–2001; youth team)
 Dragan Blatnjak (2001–2003)
 Danijel Subašić (youth team until 2003; senior team 2003–2009)
 Josip Bilaver (2003–2017)
 Želimir Terkeš (2004–2011, 2012–2013, 2014–2018)
 Dragan Župan (2005–2006, 2006–2009, 2012–2013, 2016–2020) 
 Šime Vrsaljko (youth team until 2006)

Note: For a complete list of NK Zadar players, see :Category:NK Zadar players.

Managerial history

 Ante Čačić (1989–1991)
 Goran Krešimir Vidov (1992)
 Petar Zrilić (1992)
 Ivica Matković (1992–1993)
 Jakov Pinčić (interim; 1993)
 Ivan Gudelj (1993)
 Jakov Pinčić (interim; 1993)
 Luka Bonačić (1994)
 Jakov Pinčić (interim; 1994)
 Tomislav Bašić (1994)
 Josip Bajlo (1994–1995)
 Stanko Mršić (1995–1996)
 Ante Čačić (1996–1997)
 Ivan Katalinić (1997–1998)
 Boris Tičić (1998)
 Josip Skoblar (1998)
 Josip Bajlo (1999)
 Nikica Cukrov (1999–2000)
 Jakov Pinčić (interim; 2000)
 Mladen Vranković (2000)
 Siniša Jalić (2000–2001)
 Miodrag Paunović (2001)
 Stanko Mršić (2001–2002)
 Vjeran Simunić (2002–2003)
 Stanko Mršić (2003–2005)
 Vjeran Simunić (2005)
 Jakov Pinčić (interim; 2005)
 Milo Nižetić (2005)
 Jakov Pinčić (interim; 2005)
 Predrag Jurić (2005–2006)
 Dalibor Zebić (2006–2008)
 Zvonimir Jurić (interim; 2008)
 Ivica Datković (2008)
 Dalibor Zebić (2008–2012)
 Ferdo Milin (2012–2014)
 Zvonimir Jurić (interim; 2014)
 Miroslav Blažević (2014–2015)
 Igor Štimac (2015)
 Zvonimir Jurić (interim; 2015)
 Josip Butić (2015–2017)
 Ivan Pudar (2017)
 Leopold Burčul (2017)
 Vjeran Simunić (2017–2018)
 Dragan Blatnjak (2018)
 Krešimir Sunara (2018–2019)
 Mislav Karoglan (2019)
 Marko Pinčić (2019–2020)

References

External links

NK Zadar profile at UEFA.com
NK Zadar at Sportnet.hr 

 
Defunct football clubs in Croatia
Football clubs in Zadar County
Association football clubs established in 1945
Association football clubs disestablished in 2020
Sport in Zadar
1945 establishments in Croatia
2020 disestablishments in Croatia